Eutelsat W3A is a communications satellite owned by Eutelsat S.A. Placed at 7° East, it broadcasts TV channels, radios and other digital data. It entered operational service on 15 May 2004.

Built by EADS Astrium on a Eurostar-3000S satellite bus, it is equipped with 42 Ku-band transponders broadcasting in Europe, North Africa, the Middle East and sub-Saharan Africa and 2 Ka-band transponders.

It was launched on 15 March 2004 at 23:06:00 UTC by Proton-M / Briz-M from the Baikonur Cosmodrome. Its estimated lifespan is 15 years.

It is equipped with Skyplex technique for multiplexing on board. It is the first geostationary satellite to use a lithium-ion battery.

It is used by the European Broadcasting Union's Eurovision network. It broadcasts the Turkish Digiturk offerings and numerous Internet connection services such as OpenSky, Hughes Europe or Skylogic.

Eutelsat 7A 
In December 2011, Eutelsat announced, that their satellite assets will be renamed under a unified brand name effective from March 2012. This satellite became Eutelsat 7A.

References

External links 
 Page officielle de présentation d'Eutelsat W3A
 Zones couvertes
 Eutelsat W3A sur le site d'EADS Astrium

Communications satellites in geostationary orbit
Satellites using the Eurostar bus